The Boardwalk Bullet is a wooden roller coaster at the Kemah Boardwalk amusement park in Kemah, Texas, United States. Opened August 31, 2007, it is the only wooden roller coaster in Greater Houston, and one of only four wooden coasters in Texas. The bullet is one of the most popular rides at Kemah Boardwalk.

Awards

References

External links 

Wooden roller coasters
Greater Houston
Galveston Bay Area
Roller coasters introduced in 2007
Roller coasters in Texas